"Honey Chile" is a 1967 single by Motown girl group Martha Reeves and the Vandellas on the Gordy label. Produced by Richard Morris and written by Morris and Sylvia Moy, 
This was the first single to bill Martha Reeves by her full name, as opposed to simply "Martha" and the Vandellas.

"Honey Chile" rose to number eleven on the Billboard pop singles chart and number five on the Billboard R&B singles chart.

Background
The song describes how the narrator (Martha Reeves) wanting to get rid of her boyfriend who's been courting and dating other girls behind her back though she is too weak to let him go stating "I'll walk a country mile to stay with you".  This song, rare for a pop song, actually shows character development: at the end of the first verse she states that she is worthless without him, while in the second to last line she says she will find the strength to leave him.

Filled with Southern connotations (inspired by Reeves' birth in rural Alabama),  It is notable for several reasons: it is the first track to feature new member, Martha's younger sister Sandra "Lois" Reeves replacing just-fired Betty Kelley, it was the group's twelfth top 40 pop single, and it was also the last top 40 hit the group would score throughout the rest of their Motown tenure though they would score several top 40 R&B singles before leaving the label in 1973. It was also the first single to be credited as Martha Reeves and the Vandellas after the label requested that some of the lead singers of several groups put their name in front of the group's to earn billing for both lead singer and group.

Personnel
Lead vocals by Martha Reeves
Background vocals by Rosalind Ashford and Sandra "Lois" Reeves
Instrumentation by The Funk Brothers

Chart performance

Samples and Covers
The song was covered by The Jackson 5 on their 1971 album Maybe Tomorrow.

References

1967 singles
Soul songs
Martha and the Vandellas songs
Songs written by Sylvia Moy
Songs written by Richard Morris (songwriter)
Gordy Records singles
1967 songs